The 1977 Vancouver Whitecaps season was the fourth season of the Whitecaps, and their fourth season in the North American Soccer League, which was at the time, the top flight of American Canadian soccer.

Qualifying for the playoffs for the second-straight season, the Whitecaps were eliminated by their Cascadian rivals, the Seattle Sounders, for the second straight season, in the first round of the postseason. The 'Caps finished second in their division, behind the Minnesota Kicks.

Background 

The Vancouver Whitecaps came into their fourth season riding off the most successful season in franchise history. The 1976 squad qualified for the NASL playoffs for the first time, but lost to their Cascadian rivals, Seattle Sounders in the first round of the playoffs. Entering the 1977 season, the club made several defensive upgrades.

Club

Roster

Squad 
The 1977 squad

Team management and staff

Competitions

Preseason

NASL

Standings 

Pld = Matches played; W = Matches won; L = Matches lost; GF = Goals for; GA = Goals against; GD = Goal difference; Pts = PointsSource:

Results summary

Results by round

Match results

NASL Playoffs

Mid-season friendlies

Statistics

Transfers

In

Out

Loan in

Loan out

See also 
 1977 in American soccer
 1977 in Canadian soccer
 History of Vancouver Whitecaps FC
 Vancouver Whitecaps (1974–1984)
 Vancouver Whitecaps (1986–2010)
 Vancouver Whitecaps FC

References 

Vancouver Whitecaps (1974–1984) seasons
Vancouver Whitecaps
Vancouver Whitecaps Season, 1977
Vancouver Whitecaps